The Elektrik Keyboard was a computer and musical instrument store located on North Lincoln Avenue in Chicago, Illinois in the 1970s and 1980s. In the late '70s it added personal computers to its lineup, and began publishing Apple II computer software written by programmer Chris Oberth. The software, advertised in the company's catalog and sold on cassette, largely consisted of games including some that emulated popular arcade titles.

Software
The Elektrik Keyboard published the following titles written by Chris Oberth in 1978 and 1979:

References

External links
 Retrogaming Times Issue #21: Interview with Programmer Christian Oberth (Part 1)
 Retrogaming Times Issue #24: Interview with Programmer Christian Oberth (Part 2)
 Retrogaming Times Issue #27: Interview with Programmer Christian Oberth (Part 3)

Defunct software companies of the United States
Defunct video game companies of the United States